The Southern Railway Terminal, originally officially "New Orleans Terminal", in New Orleans  was constructed by the Southern Railway in 1908 on the neutral ground of Basin Street at the intersection of Canal Street.  The building was designed by Daniel Burnham, who was also the architect for the Union Station in Washington D.C. The station also served the New Orleans and Northeastern Railroad and the New Orleans Terminal Company. It was the terminus for many of Southern's premier trains, most notably the Crescent. As such, it was the "front door" to New Orleans for many passengers from the Northeast.

From New Orleans, Southern provided service to the following areas: 

 Northern Gateway (Cincinnati, Louisville and Washington D.C.)
 Western Gateway (Memphis and St. Louis) 
 Ports (Baltimore, Brunswick, Charleston, Gulfport, Jacksonville, and Savannah)

The station was demolished in 1956 after all passenger service was relocated to the new Union Passenger Terminal. After station and tracks were removed the neutral ground was landscaped and the area was designated as the "Garden of the Americas."

References

External links
 Article from The American Architect (1909) with floor plan

Transportation buildings and structures in New Orleans
Railway stations in the United States opened in 1905
Railway stations closed in 1954
Demolished railway stations in the United States
Stations along Southern Railway lines in the United States
Former railway stations in Louisiana